Weisendorf is a municipality in the district of Erlangen-Höchstadt, in Bavaria, Germany. It belongs to the administrative region of Middle Franconia.

Geography
Weisendorf is located 15 km west of Erlangen.

Division of the town

Economy
Most citizens of Weisendorf work in nearby Erlangen (known for its university and Siemens AG) and the region of Nuremberg or alternatively adidas in the nearby city of Herzogenaurach.

Culture

Food
A local food speciality is the "Aischgründer Spiegelkarpfen", a type of fried fish.

Transport
Weisendorf is near the motorway A3 (Frankfurt am Main-Regensburg). The next railroad station is located in Erlangen (c. 15 km). The Nuremberg Airport (c. 30 km) provides access to many cities in Europe and the rest of the world.

References

External links
 Municipal website
 Weisendorf Fire Department 

Erlangen-Höchstadt